Giancarlo Chiaramello (born 18 February 1939) is an Italian composer, conductor and arranger.

Born in Bra, in 1958 Chiaramello graduated in piano, composition and vocal polyphony at the Giuseppe Verdi Conservatory in Turin.  He won two international competitions for young composers, the Francesco Ballo Prize in 1960 and the Ranieri of Monaco Award in 1962. Between sixties and seventies he was arranger for several pop and rock artists, and composed scores for many stage plays. Chiaramello has also scored television series as well as several films, including Number One (1973), Crazy Joe (1974), An Average Little Man (1977), Prickly Pears (1981) and Mani di fata (1983). in 1975 he won the Nastro d'Argento for Best Score for Luca Ronconi 's Orlando Furioso.

References

External links  
 

 

1939 births
Italian film score composers
Italian male film score composers
Living people
Nastro d'Argento winners
Italian music arrangers
Italian male conductors (music)
20th-century Italian conductors (music)
People from the Province of Cuneo
21st-century Italian conductors (music)
21st-century Italian male musicians
20th-century Italian male musicians
Eurovision Song Contest conductors